Mufti Hafidh Syed Ziauddin Naqshbandi  (Zia-e-Millat) born on 15 August 1975 at Hangarga Nizamabad, Andhra Pradesh, India. He  is an Indian Muslim cleric who is the current Shaykh Ul Fiqh of the Jamia Nizamia and the Sadar Mufti (Chief Mufti) at Jamia Nizamia in Hyderabad in India. Mufti Syed Ziauddin is the Founder-Director of the Abul Hasanaat Islamic Research Center (AHIRC) in Hyderabad. He is a scholar and an Islamic speaker of international renown.

Abul Hasanaat Islamic Research Center (AHIRC)
Mufti Syed Ziauddin established the AHIRC on 29 December 2007. AHIRC maintains an Islamic website Ziaislamic.com in Urdu, English and Hindi. AHIRC has various (other) departments like the Dept. of research, Dept. of education, Dept. of Islamic jurisprudence, Dept. of translation, Dept. of Da’wah, Dept. of publication.  Many books have been published through AHIRC and Da’wah work is performed in more than 100 mosques in and around the city under its aegis.

Islamic speaker
Mufti Syed Ziauddin has also presented various papers on various topics in seminars and conventions nationally and internationally.

Fatwas 
Halal sources of earning one's living.
In the Shariah, those sources of living are Forbidden (Haraam), in which wealth is concentrated in the hands of a few or someone is oppressed or those which involve cheating, deception, etc. or which imply helping or aiding sinful things.  It is in light of these principles that usury has been declared Forbidden and seizing of advance money is also prohibited.  Apart from this other sources of earning one's living are permitted and allowed, like business, a job, giving something on hire, partnership, any kind of crafts or partnership, i.e. one person's money and another person's effort. If a permissible source is mixed with something which is Forbidden, then using such a source is impermissible.  For e.g. investing money in stock exchange and share business is permitted, but if the company deals in something which is forbidden, then investment in such a company is also impermissible.  Designing websites is in itself permissible.

Publications
Mufti Syed Ziauddin has authored more than 100 books:
 Shab e Meraj Fazail o Ibadaat
 Karamate-Imam-hasan-hussain.r.z
 Anwaare Khitaabat (1-12) – A book for Islamic speakers, one for each Islamic month.
 Tasarruf-e-Khair Ul Mursaleen- A treatise on the power and authority given to Prophet Muhammad by Allah.
 Test Tube Baby aur Shara’i Nuqte Nazar- On the Islamic viewpoint about IVF. 
 DNA Test ki Shara’i Haisiyat- On the Islamic viewpoint about DNA testing for various purposes.
 D N A.
  Haqqaniyat Imam Hussain Raziallahu Anhu aur Hadithe Qustuntuniya- On the excellence of Imam Hussain and a historical analysis of the participation of Yazid in the Battle of Constantinople.
 Meraj Shareef aur deedare Ilaahi- On the ascension of Prophet Muhammad
  Seeratun Nabi Sallallahu alaihi wa sallam – A biography of Prophet Muhammad.
  Masaaile Zakaat – ‘Asr Haazir ke tanaazur mein- On Zakaat, its rules, and the Shariah rulings about modern issues related to Zakaat.
  Qurbani – Ahkaam aur masaail - On the sacrifice of animals, its philosophy and rules.
 20 Raka’at Taraweeh- An analysis of the number of Raka’at in Taraweeh.
 Ghair Muslimeen se taalluqaat- On the relations between Muslims and non-Muslims

Many of his books have been translated into English, Hindi, Telugu and Kannada languages through the Dept. of Translation of AHIRC.

Media
Mufti Syed Ziauddin regularly appears as Mufti on various (live) Islamic programs on various channels, including ETV Urdu, Munsif TV and 4 TV. Many channels also show his recorded and live speeches.
Articles by Mufti Syed Ziauddin have appeared in Siasat, Munsif, Rashtriya Sahara, and Etemaad.  The Fatwa section of the Friday edition of Etemaad Daily is handled by Mufti Syed Ziauddin.

See also
 Shaykh Ul Islam Imam Muhammad Anwaarullah Farooqui
 Jamia Nizamia
 Muhammad Hamidullah
 Islamic scholar

References

External links
 Fatawa's
 Urdu Fatawa 

1975 births
Indian Muslims
People from Nizamabad district
Sunni imams
Hanafis
Living people
Indian Sufis
Naqshbandi order
Jamia Nizamia alumni